Traktor Tashkent Stadium was a multi-use stadium in Tashkent, Uzbekistan.  It was used mostly for football matches and was the home stadium of Traktor Tashkent. Also it was home ground for Lokomotiv Tashkent. The stadium holds 6,400 people.

History
The stadium was home ground for capital club Traktor Tashkent. After club was dissolved, here also played home matches Lokomotiv Tashkent. In July 2009 it was announced that stadium would have been closed for reconstruction to build new arena for Lokomotiv, Lokomotiv Stadium. In spring 2012 the reconstruction works were finished.

Football venues in Uzbekistan
Traktor Tashkent